This is a list of sovereign states and territories by carbon dioxide emissions due to certain forms of human activity, based on the EDGAR database created by European Commission and Netherlands Environmental Assessment Agency released in 2018.

The data only consider carbon dioxide emissions from the burning of fossil fuels and cement manufacture, but not emissions from land use, land-use change and forestry. Emissions from international shipping or bunker fuels are also not included in national figures, which can make a large difference for small countries with important ports. When carbon dioxide emissions from land-use change are factored in, the majority of carbon emissions since 1905 occurred in Asia, Central and Southern America, reflecting the fact that developed nations cleared their forests in earlier centuries. Land-use factors have contributed nearly a third of total cumulative anthropogenic emissions of carbon dioxide since 1850, and until as recently as 1965 was actually a greater source of emissions than the combustion of fossil fuels and production of cement. The methodology for the calculations is public.

The top 10 largest emitter countries account for 67.6% of the world total. Since 2006, China has been emitting more  than any other country. When looking at  CO2 emissions per person, China's levels are less than half those of the United States (the next largest source of  emissions) and about one-eighth of those of Palau (the biggest  emitter per person).

Measures of territorial-based emissions, also known as production-based emissions, do not account for emissions embedded in global trade, where emissions may be imported or exported in the form of traded goods, as it only reports emissions emitted within geographical boundaries. Accordingly, a proportion of the  produced and reported in Asia and Eastern Europe is for the production of goods consumed in Western Europe and North America.

According to the review of the scientific literature conducted by the Intergovernmental Panel on Climate Change (IPCC), carbon dioxide is the most important anthropogenic greenhouse gas by warming contribution. The other major anthropogenic greenhouse gases (methane, nitrous oxide (NO) and some fluorinated gases (sulfur hexafluoride (SF), hydrofluorocarbons (HFCs), and perfluorocarbons (PFCs))), are not included in the following list, nor are humans emissions of water vapor (HO), the most important greenhouse gases, as they are negligible compared to naturally occurring quantities. Space-based measurements of carbon dioxide should allow independent monitoring in the mid-2020s.

Per capita  emissions

Fossil  emissions by country/region 
Note: the point is a decimal point, so 1.000 Mt means 1 Mt, i.e. 1,000,000 tonne.

See also

 List of countries by carbon dioxide emissions per capita
 List of countries by renewable electricity production
 List of countries by greenhouse gas emissions
 List of countries by greenhouse gas emissions per person
 Top contributors to greenhouse gas emissions

General:
 World energy supply and consumption

Notes and references

External links
Millennium Development Goals Indicators – United Nations Statistics Division
GHG data from UNFCCC – United Nations Framework Convention on Climate Change greenhouse gas (GHG) emissions data
CO emissions in kilotons – World Bank
CO emissions in metric tons per capita – Google Public Data Explorer

Carbon dioxide
Carbon dioxide emissions
Carbon dioxide emissions
Carbon dioxide emissions
Carbon dioxide emissions
Carbon dioxide emissions